Stephen John Ellis (born 7 April 1950, Edgware, Middlesex) is an English rock/pop singer, who now lives in Brighton. His biggest success was with the band Love Affair, best known for the songs "Everlasting Love", "A Day Without Love", "Rainbow Valley" and "Bringing on Back the Good Times".

Ellis later felt that Love Affair had run its course, and he left in December 1969 for a solo career: "We never really made it big anywhere but Britain and I think that if we had started to happen in America, I wouldn't have left". In 1972 he formed the band Ellis, a short lived partnership with keyboardist Zoot Money. Other members included ex-Peter Bardens guitarist Andy Gee; ex-Fat Mattress bassist Jimmy Leverton, later replaced by Nick South; and drummer Dave Lutton. The group released two albums, Riding on the Crest of a Slump in 1972, and Why Not? the following year. In 1976 one of the most popular Serbian and ex-Yugoslav bands, Smak, covered his song "El Doomo" under the title "El dumo", and achieved great success with it.

Ellis subsequently had limited chart success with the rock band Widowmaker, releasing the album Widowmaker in 1976. Widowmaker toured the UK with Nazareth, and in June 1976 joined the stadium tour, The Who Put The Boot In opening for leading rock acts such as Little Feat, The Sensational Alex Harvey Band, Streetwalkers and the headline act The Who.

He also sang on the soundtrack of Loot, a 1970 film based on Joe Orton's play, directed by Silvio Narizzano.

Ellis was performing briefly with New Amen Corner during 2013 and had an album with appearances by Paul Weller and Roger Daltrey out on Demon Records in 2008, entitled The Best of Days.

References

External links
Official site

1950 births
Living people
English male singers
English songwriters
English rock singers
People from Edgware
Widowmaker (U.K. band) members
British male songwriters